The Thurstone Personality Schedule was one of the first personality tests. It was published by Louis Leon Thurstone and Thelma Gwinn Thurstone in 1930. It underwent many revisions and adaptions.

6 year test-retest reliability was 0.53 in one study.

In 1952 around 200 firms used the test for personnel screening.

References 

Personality tests